The G.B. Emmons House is a historic house at 283 Broadway in Methuen, Massachusetts.  The two story Queen Anne house was built c. 1890 for G.B. Emmons, president of the Emmons Loom Harness Company located in neighboring Lawrence.  Despite being a fairly typical example of a fashionable residential house constructed in Methuen and Lawrence at the time, the house is prominently situated on a major road close to the town's center and has been well preserved.

The house was listed on the National Register of Historic Places in 1984.

See also
 National Register of Historic Places listings in Methuen, Massachusetts
 National Register of Historic Places listings in Essex County, Massachusetts

References

Houses in Methuen, Massachusetts
Houses completed in 1890
National Register of Historic Places in Methuen, Massachusetts
Houses on the National Register of Historic Places in Essex County, Massachusetts
Queen Anne architecture in Massachusetts